Sebastopol is a town in Leake and Scott counties, Mississippi. The population was 266 at the 2020 census.

History

Sebastopol was originally called "Hathaway Springs". The town was in existence before the Civil War but not incorporated until 1917. According to oral tradition, "a Swede" traveling through the area named the town for Sevastopol, Crimea.  It is rumored that the "Swede" was Frederick Law Olmsted (of Central Park fame) who stayed at Sebastopol House in Seguin, Texas during his travels throughout the southern United States. From 1852 to 1857, Olmsted was sent to the southern United States by his employer, The New York Times, to study and write about slavery.  It was published as  Journeys and Explorations in the Cotton Kingdom.

Sebastopol has a few local businesses that keep the town thriving. The town's main convenience store, "Duett's", has been owned and operated by the Duett family for years. The town also has "Brent's" gas station, which is closed on Sundays and stays open half a day on Wednesdays.  The station is commonly referred to as "Brent's Texaco" although Texaco plays no part in the store's operation anymore.  The town has one grocery store which was once called "Hamill's", which was bought out by Piggly Wiggly. Also a large contribution to Sebastopol is "Easom's Hardware", operated by the Easom family for many years, who also own Maxim Manufacturing on Hwy 21.  Moore's Pharmacy has been operating since 1990. New businesses have opened, including "Dollar General", “Burger Barn”, “Taste and See Deli”, "Bethel Framing", "Tangle's, "ADD Trucking" and "Adele McDill Photography".

Each fall season Sebastopol has Sebastopolooza–a fairly large fall festival. In 2010 Sebastopolooza had over a thousand people.

Sebastopol is centrally located between four larger towns, the towns of Forest, Carthage, Union and Philadelphia. Although the town has a local grocery store, most people drive to one of the larger towns to purchase basic household goods. The nearest theatre is a small  local operation located in Philadelphia, Mississippi.

The town got access to cable TV in the late 1990s, which has yet to be offered to areas located just outside the city limits. Most local people wishing to have television must subscribe to satellite programming.  This makes accessibility to high-speed internet almost impossible. On October 11, 2010, all cable services from Sky Cablevision, the only cable provider for Sebastopol, were disconnected.

Geography
Most of the town is located in Scott County, with a small portion in Leake County. In the 2000 census, all of the city's 233 residents lived in Scott County. No residents lived in the Leake County portion in 2000, and one person lived there in 2006.

Demographics

As of the 2020 United States census, there were 266 people, 115 households, and 81 families residing in the town.

As of the census of 2000, there were 233 people, 107 households, and 66 families residing in the town. The population density was 159.4 people per square mile (61.6/km). There were 118 housing units at an average density of 80.7 per square mile (31.2/km). The racial makeup of the town was 95.28% White, 3.00% African American, 0.86% Native American, 0.86% from other races. Hispanic or Latino of any race were 1.72% of the population.

There were 107 households, out of which 28.0% had children under the age of 18 living with them, 46.7% were married couples living together, 10.3% had a female householder with no husband present, and 38.3% were non-families. 37.4% of all households were made up of individuals, and 18.7% had someone living alone who was 65 years of age or older. The average household size was 2.18 and the average family size was 2.83.

In the town, the age distribution of the population shows 21.5% under the age of 18, 9.4% from 18 to 24, 26.6% from 25 to 44, 24.9% from 45 to 64, and 17.6% who were 65 years of age or older. The median age was 40 years. For every 100 females, there were 95.8 males. For every 100 females age 18 and over, there were 92.6 males.

The median income for a household in the town was $31,250, and the median income for a family was $47,500. Males had a median income of $26,625 versus $25,000 for females. The per capita income for the town was $23,630. About 9.5% of families and 18.6% of the population were below the poverty line, including 23.8% of those under the age of eighteen and 28.2% of those sixty-five or over.

Education
The Town of Sebastopol is served by the Scott County School District. The town has one public High School whose mascot is the Sebastopol Bobcats. Sebastopol also has a private school, Pine Grove Christian Academy, owned and operated by Pine Grove Pentecostal Church.

Notable people
 The Leake County Revelers, country music string band

References

Towns in Scott County, Mississippi
Towns in Leake County, Mississippi
Towns in Mississippi